Athletics competitions at the 1965 Bolivarian Games
were held at the Estadio Universitario in Quito,
Ecuador.

A detailed history of the early editions of the Bolivarian Games between 1938
and 1989 was published in a book written (in Spanish) by José Gamarra
Zorrilla, former president of the Bolivian Olympic Committee, and first
president (1976-1982) of ODESUR.  Gold medal winners from Ecuador were published by the Comité Olímpico Ecuatoriano.

A total of 30 events were contested, 21 by men and 9 by women.

Medal summary
Medal winners were published.

Men

Women

Medal table (unofficial)

References

Athletics at the Bolivarian Games
International athletics competitions hosted by Ecuador
Bolivarian Games
1965 in Ecuadorian sport